Bara Aulia Degree College is an educational institution in Chittagong District, Bangladesh.

Location 
The college is located in Amirabad Union of Lohagara Upazila of Chittagong District.

History 
It was established in 1980. It was founded by Alhaj Mohammad Aman Alam.

Education 
It is a graduate level educational institution.

References 

Lohagara Upazila, Chittagong
Colleges in Chittagong
1980 establishments in Bangladesh